Snacking may refer to:
Eating a snack
Grazing (human eating pattern), an eating pattern